Let It Snow: A Holiday Collection is the eleventh studio album and second full-length Christmas album from Jewel, released on September 24, 2013, through Reflections Records.

Background
Jewel released her first Christmas album in 1999. Joy: A Holiday Collection was a commercial success, receiving Platinum certifications. The announcement of a second Christmas album came on August 6, 2013. In an interview with The Wall Street Journal about recording another Christmas album, Jewel was quoted as saying "I wanted this record to have a resemblance to the first album. It’s a continuation of mood and spirit of that record, with the mood and feel of the album artwork with an image and tone that evokes that spirit." According to her official website, the album "features country, folk-pop roots with a classical twist."

Production
Let It Snow was recorded in 2013 and produced by Jewel, along with Steve Skinner, Joe Mardin and Robbie Kondor. Included with ten traditional holiday songs are two originals recorded for the album, titled "It's Christmastime" and "Blue Crystal Glow."

Release
The album was released on September 24, 2013, and made available in several editions. The Target edition contains an exclusive track, "Deck The Halls." Bed Bath & Beyond and iTunes offer the deluxe edition, which includes four additional tracks.

Critical reception

Let It Snow: A Holiday Collection has received mostly positive feedback from music critics. Stephen Thomas Erlewine of AllMusic writes, "(the album) may not transcend the conventions of a Christmas album, but it also avoids the pitfalls and, on the whole, it's better than her first foray into seasonal song."

Commercial performance
As of August 2015, the album has sold 41,000 copies in the United States.

Track listing

Personnel
Credits adapted from AllMusic

Musicians
 Jewel – acoustic guitar, vocals
 Robbie Kondor – bass, bass (vocal), clapping, harmonica, keyboards, knee slaps, mandolin, penny whistle, piano, vibraphone
 Joe Mardin – bass, brushes, cymbals, drums, keyboards, sleigh bells, tambourine, background vocals
 Amie Amis – french horn
 Eliot Bailen – cello
 Sherrod Barnes – acoustic guitar
 Mallory Bennhoff – background vocals
 Emily Bindiger – choir/chorus, background vocals
 Paul Brandenburg – trumpet
 Laurent Caillat – choir/chorus
 Larry Campbell – fiddle, guitar, pedal steel guitar
 John Clark – french horn
 Nancy Danino – choir/chorus, translation
 Nick Donohue – background vocals
 Dave Eggar – cello, soloist
 Gabrielle Fink – violin
 Vince Gill – guitar, soloist
 Rachel Golub – violin
 Julie Goodale – viola
 Nikki Gregoroff – background vocals
 Rebecca Harris – violin
 Stan Harrison – clarinet, saxophone

 Richard Heckman – English horn, oboe
 Erin Hill – harp
 Alexandra Jenkins – violin
 Marco Joachim – acoustic guitar
 Birch Johnson – trombone
 Zev Katz – bass
 Dillon Kondor – guitar
 Kenny Kosek – fiddle
 Katie Kresek – violin
 Ron Lawrence – viola
 Zoë Lewis – background vocals
 Michael Londra – choir/chorus, translation, background vocals
 Pat Mangan – violin
 Trevor Neumann – flugelhorn
 Victoria Paterson – violin
 Sophie Piggott – background vocals
 Marcus Rojas – tuba
 Peter Sachon – cello
 Daniel Sadownick – djembe, shaker, triangle
 Laura Sherman – harp
 Ira Siegel – guitar
 Abi Sirota – background vocals
 Sam Skinner – guitar
 Steve Skinner – keyboards, organ, piano, sleigh bells
 Frank Vilardi – clapping, drums, knee slaps

Technical
 Jewel – arranger, executive producer, production
 Robbie Kondor – arranger, conductor, engineer, production
 Joe Mardin – arranger, engineer, mixing, production, programming, vocal arrangement
 Steve Skinner – arranger, engineer, main personnel, production, programming
 Michael O'Reilly – engineer, mixing
 Seth Glassman – engineer
 Ken Halford – engineer
 Roy Hendrickson – engineer
 Kabir Hermon – engineer
 Mike Nolan – engineer
 Matt Rausch – engineer
 Alan Silverman – mastering
 Katie Kresek – concertmaster
 Tom Chaggaris – art direction
 Virginia Davis – management
 Dave Eggar – contractor
 Russell James – photography
 Nicole Perez – publicity

Charts

References

2013 Christmas albums
Jewel (singer) albums
Christmas albums by American artists
Folk rock Christmas albums
Pop rock Christmas albums